Leni Chris Anitoni Apisai (born 8 March 1996) is a New Zealand rugby union player who currently plays as a hooker for  in New Zealand's domestic Mitre 10 Cup and the  in the international Super Rugby competition.

Early career

Born in the town of Porirua in the greater Wellington metropolitan area, Apisai was educated at Aotea College in his hometown before later moving to Wellington College where he played first XV rugby.

Senior Rugby

Aged just 18, Apisai first played provincial rugby for  during the 2014 ITM Cup, making 2 appearances including 1 start.   The campaign was not a happy one for the Lions as they were relegated down to the Championship division for the 2015 season after recording just 1 win in 10 games.

Wellington were unable to gain promotion back to the Premiership at the first time of asking, finishing 2nd behind  on the Championship log before being defeated 26-25 by the same opposition in the playoff final.

Matu'u departed for Gloucester prior to the 2016 Mitre 10 Cup leaving Apisai unchallenged as Wellington's main hooker for the year.

Super Rugby

After just 2 provincial appearances for Wellington, Apisai was named as part of the  wider training group ahead of the 2015 Super Rugby season.   Unsurprisingly given his tender years and lack of top-level experience, he was unable to get on the field at any point during the year, taking the role of the franchise's fourth choice rake behind; Dane Coles, Motu Matu'u and Brayden Mitchell.

Doors began to open for him ahead of the 2016 season with Mitchell leaving after his short-term contract had expired and Coles and Matu'u both being struck down by injury in pre-season. Apisai started the first 3 games of the year and played a total of 5 matches in his first season as a member of the franchise's senior squad.

Apisai signed to the Blues for the 2018 Super Rugby season.

International

Apisai was a New Zealand Schools representative in 2013 and was later captained the New Zealand Under-20 side which finished 5th in the 2016 World Rugby Under 20 Championship in England, scoring 1 try in 5 matches.

In October 2016 Apisai, who affiliates to the Ngāti Awa iwi, was named in the Māori All Blacks squad for their end-of-year tour to the Northern Hemisphere.   He debuted as a 75th minute replacement for the Māori captain Ash Dixon in a 27-14 defeat by Munster on 11 November 2016.

Career Honours

Hurricanes

Super Rugby - 2016

Super Rugby Statistics

References

External links
 

1996 births
Living people
Auckland rugby union players
Blues (Super Rugby) players
Hurricanes (rugby union) players
Māori All Blacks players
Moana Pasifika players
New Zealand rugby union players
Ngāti Awa people
People educated at Wellington College (New Zealand)
Rugby union hookers
Rugby union players from Porirua
Sunwolves players
Wellington rugby union players
Highlanders (rugby union) players